Tim Tam is a chocolate biscuit available in Australia and New Zealand.

Tim Tam may also refer to:

Tim Tam (horse) (1955–1982), racehorse
Tim Tam And The Turn-Ons, R&B/Soul musicians on 60s Palmer label